The Prudential Tunnel is a tunnel through which Interstate 90 (the Massachusetts Turnpike) runs underneath the Prudential Tower complex in Boston. It was created in 1965 as part of the first extension of the Turnpike into Boston. The tunnel has been criticized for its poor lighting in comparison to the newer O'Neill Tunnel, Fort Point Tunnel, and Ted Williams Tunnel. In 2014, a hole was punched in the wall of the tunnel following an accident involving a large truck. The tunnel has since been repaired and is fully operational again. One exit is contained within the tunnel, the Copley Interchange on the Massachusetts Turnpike.

External links
Mass Roads information on the Western Expressway

Road tunnels in Massachusetts
Tunnels completed in 1965
Tunnels in Boston
Interstate 90